The Ferret armoured car, also commonly called the Ferret scout car, is a British armoured fighting vehicle designed and built for reconnaissance purposes. The Ferret was produced between 1952 and 1971 by the UK company Daimler. It was widely used by regiments in the British Army, as well as the RAF Regiment and Commonwealth countries throughout the period.

History
The Ferret was developed in 1949 as a result of a British Army requirement issued in 1947. 'Light reconnaissance cars' existed during the Second World War, notably the Daimler Dingo.

Given its experience with the successful Dingo (6,626 produced and one of two British AFVs produced throughout WWII) Daimler was awarded a development contract in October 1948, and in June 1950 the first prototype of the Car, Scout, 4×4, Liaison (Ferret) Mark 1 was delivered.

Designated the FV 701(C), it was one of several versions resembling the original Daimler scout cars, and represented the basic model Ferret. This shared many similar design features with the Dingo, notably the H form drive train in which a central differential eliminates loss of traction due to wheel-slip, and parallel drive shafts considerably reduced the height of the vehicle (roughly equivalent to that of a tracked AFV) compared to conventional armoured car designs.

Like the Daimler scout car, the Ferret suspension consisted of pairs of transverse links and single coil springs, the wheels driven by Tracta constant-velocity joints, but the Ferret benefited from epicyclic reduction gears reducing transmission torque loads, essential with the six cylinder 4.26 litre water-cooled Rolls-Royce B.60 petrol engine.

This improved power-to-weight ratio, longer wheelbase ( compared with the Dingo's ) and the fitting of larger 9.00×16 run flat tyres increased speed and mobility over broken ground.

Compared with the Daimler Dingo and Canadian Ford Lynx, the Ferret featured a larger cabin, directly mounted to the hull (the Ferret is much noisier than Dingo, lacking a monocoque body).

 steel plate protects the crew from shell splinters at most angles except directly overhead because the basic vehicle was open-topped and unarmed, with the exception of six forward-firing grenade launchers fitted to the hull over the front wheels (normally carrying smoke grenades), a feature found on all subsequent marks and models.

However, the Ferret normally carried a .303" (7.7 mm) Bren light machine gun or a pintle-mounted .30" (7.62 mm) Browning light machine gun in addition to the crew's personal weapons.

Ferret Mark 2

Compared to the lightly armed and protected Mark 1, the Mark 2 was designed from the outset to mount a .30" (7.62 mm) Browning in a one-person traversable turret, at the cost of one crew member. While this offered better crew protection and protected the exposed gunner, the turret raised the height of the vehicle.

Mark 1 and Mark 2 Ferrets were used by Australian Military 1953-70, at which time Australian military forces disposed of them at public auction.

According to the US Military, 20 national armies were operating the Ferret in 1996.

Production
A total of 4,409 Ferrets, including 16 sub-models under various Mark numbers, were manufactured between 1952 and 1962, when production ceased. It is possible to upgrade the engine using the more powerful FB60 version from the Austin Princess 4-Litre-R; this upgrade providing a  gain over the standard B60 engine.

Operators

Current operators
 : 65
 : 8
 : 30
 
 : 15
 : 8
 : 8
 : 55
 : 15; Mk 4 variant
 : 180
 : 12
 : 90
 : 10
 : some donated by South Africa
 : 40; Mk 4 variant
 : 40
 : 15
 : 90 
 : 10
 : 3
 : 40–50
 : 15
 : At least one Mk1 purchased privately.
 : 28

Former operators

 : 265
 : 1
 : 124
 : 200; likely replaced by the Panhard AML
 : 30
 : Used by the Royal Hong Kong Regiment.
 : 50
 : 20
 : 5; possibly donated by Jordan
 : 15
 : 92; Mk 2 variant (Some still active in Royal Malaysian Police)
 : 45
 : 9; Mk 2 variant
 : 6 Mk 2, 1 Mk 1, operated by 11 Infantry Recce Company
 
 : 32; Mk 4 variant
 
 : 30
 : 18
 : 231
 : 15
 : 42
 
 : 30
 : 10

Variants

There are several Marks of Ferret, including those with varying equipment, turret or no turret and armed with Swingfire anti-tank missiles. Including all the marks and experimental variants, there have probably been over 60 different vehicles.

Mk 1
 FV701C
 Liaison duties
 No turret
 Armament .30" (7.62 mm) Browning MG

MK 1/1
 Fitted with thicker side and rear hull plates during manufacture
 Sealed hull for fording
 Armament .30" (7.62 mm) Browning MG

Mk 1/2
 As Mk 1/1 but fitted with fixed turret with hinged roof door
 Crew of three
 Armament Bren LMG, later GPMG

Mk 1/2
 As Mk 1/1 but fitted with flotation screen
 Armament .30" (7.62 mm) Browning MG

Mk 2
 Original reconnaissance vehicle with 2-door turret from Alvis Saracen APC
 Armament .30" (7.62 mm) Browning MG

Mk 2/1
 Original Mk 1 with 2-door turret from Alvis Saracen APC
 Armament .30" (7.62 mm) Browning MG with Bren LMG stowage

Mk 2/2
 Original Mk 1 with extension collar and 3-door turret
 Armament .30" (7.62 mm) Browning MG

Mk 2/3
 As original Mk 2 but fitted with thicker side and rear hull plates during manufacture
 Armament .30" (7.62 mm) Browning MG

Mk 2/4
 Original Mk 2 but fitted with welded-on appliqué on side and rear of hull and turret
 Armament .30" (7.62 mm) Browning MG

Mk 2/5
 As Mk 1 fitted with appliqué plates as the Mk 2/4
 Armament .30" (7.62 mm) Browning MG with Bren LMG stowage

MK 2/6
 FV703
 As Mk 2/3 converted as carrier for *Vigilant antitank missile
 Armament .30" (7.62 mm) Browning MG and four missiles mounted in boxes, two on each side of turret
 Used by British Army and Abu Dhabi

Mk 2/7
 FV701
 As Mk 2/6 stripped of anti-tank missiles after Vigilant withdrawn from service

Mk 3
 Basic hull for Mk 4 and 5
 Larger wheels
 Heavier armour
 Stronger suspension
 Flotation screen

Mk 4
 FV711
 Reconnaissance vehicle with 2-door turret from Alvis Saracen APC
 Also Mk 2/3 rebuilt to new specification
 Armament .30" (7.62 mm) Browning MG

Mk 5
 FV712
 Mk 3 hull with unusual wide flat turret for Swingfire anti-tank missiles and L7 GPMG

Ferret 80

References

Bibliography

External links

 Ferret Scout Car in Canadian Service
 Warwheels.net
 Ferret Walk Arounds on Prime Portal
 The Ontario Regiment (RCAC) Ferret Club, Oshawa, Ontario, Canada
 
 King's Own Royal Border Regiment Museum, Carlisle Castle, Cumbria, England has an example on display

Airborne fighting vehicles
Scout cars of the United Kingdom
Scout cars of the Cold War
Cold War armoured fighting vehicles of the United Kingdom
Daimler military vehicles
Military vehicles introduced in the 1950s
Wheeled reconnaissance vehicles